Kala (Qala) is a rural locality (a selo) in Derbentsky District, Republic of Dagestan, Russia. The population was 1,752 as of 2010. There are 42 streets.

Geography 
Kala is located 157 km southwest of Derbent (the district's administrative centre) by road. Shinaz and Kina are the nearest rural localities.

Nationalities 
Azerbaijanis, Tabasarans and Dargins live there.

References 

Rural localities in Derbentsky District